Liana Albertovna Ganeyeva (also romanized Ganeeva; born 20 December 1997) is a Russian ice hockey player and member of the Russian national ice hockey team, currently serving as alternate captain of Dinamo-Neva Saint Petersburg in the Zhenskaya Hockey League (ZhHL).

Ganeyeva participated in the women's ice hockey tournament at the 2018 Winter Olympics with the Olympic Athletes from Russia ice hockey team and represented Russia at the IIHF Women's World Championships in 2017, 2019, and 2021.

References

External links
 
 

1997 births
Living people
People from Bashkortostan
Russian women's ice hockey defencemen
Olympic ice hockey players of Russia
Ice hockey players at the 2018 Winter Olympics
Competitors at the 2017 Winter Universiade
Competitors at the 2019 Winter Universiade
Universiade gold medalists for Russia
Universiade medalists in ice hockey
Ice hockey players at the 2022 Winter Olympics
Sportspeople from Bashkortostan